Demian Fenton (born  March 6, 1975) is an American filmmaker and musician originally from the Pocono Mountains region of Pennsylvania, and currently residing in Philadelphia.

Fenton edited the films Rock School (2005), Head Space (2006) (which he also appeared in,) Two Days in April (2007), and The Art of the Steal (2009), and The Atomic States of America (2012).  He made his co-directorial debut with 2011's Last Days Here.

As a musician, Fenton has also played guitar in the heavy metal bands Otesanek, Puritan and Facedowninshit. Until recently, he played  guitar in the proto-metal band Serpent Throne with Don Argott, a frequent film collaborator.

Filmography
Director
Last Days Here (2011) (co-directed with Don Argott)

Editor
Rock School (2005)
Head Space (2006)
Two Days in April (2007)
The Art of the Steal (2009)
The Atomic States of America (2012)

References

External links
 
 Serpent Throne on Myspace
 Otesanek at Encyclopaedia Metallum

American film editors
1975 births
Living people